William Marion Raines Senior High School is a historically black high school in Jacksonville, Florida. The school is located off Moncrief Road in Jacksonville, Florida's northside at the corner Raines Avenue in northwest Jacksonville. Raines serves approximately 1000 students. The school is 97 percent  African-American, 1 percent Hispanic, 1 percent Mixed and 1 percent Caucasian. The campus was improved in 1990 & 2002 to include a new science wing, field house and administrative wing.

The school was named in honor of William Marion Raines, a prominent black educator in Jacksonville and principal at Matthew Gilbert High School from 1938 until his death in 1950.

History

In 1964, with an increase in Jacksonville's African American population, Duval County School Board decided to send African American students to Jean Ribault High School, but the all-white faculty and students rejected the idea. The school board then decided to build a new facility, costing two million dollars. School No. 165 opened its doors at 3663 Clarkson Avenue on January 25, 1965. The opening of the school brought about the reassignment of 1,305 black high school students in grades nine through twelve from Northwestern Junior-Senior High School to the new school. The 2000 student capacity high school was a $2 million project and duplicated the new Fletcher High School in the Beaches community. The school opened unnamed and was referred to simply as School No. 165. On June 10, 1965, at a school board meeting the school was officially renamed William Marion Raines Senior High School. 

Andrew A. Robinson was appointed principal of the new school. Robinson, a 35-year-old African-American and Jacksonville native, held a Bachelor of Science degree from FAMU and a doctorate in education from Columbia U.

Raines remained an all-African American school until the Mims vs The Duval County Schools decision in 1971.

Raines was originally accredited in 1968. It was the first school in Duval County to achieve accreditation. Raines was re-accredited in 1978, 1988, 1998 and 2008 and was given glowing compliments from the visiting boards.

Raines has been under the leadership of 12 principals: Dr. Andrew A. Robinson (1965–1969), Dr. Ezekial W. Bryant (1969–1972), Kernaa McFarlin (1972–1978), Ike James (1978–1979), Jimmie Johnson (longest serving principal 1979–1995), Dr. Milton H. Threadcraft (1995–1997), Dr. Roy I. Mitchell (1997–2002), Carol H. Daniels (first female principal 2002–2006), Nongongoma Majova-Seane (2006–2009),  George E. Maxey (2009-2011), Ms. Shateena Brown (December 8, 2011 – 2013) & the 12th and current principal Vincent Hall (2013–Present). Vincent Hall is the first Raines graduate to serve as principal.

Raines became the county's science, math and engineering magnet school in 1990. This new focus supported by the addition of the Andrew A. Robinson Science wing in that same year. Raines received its first ninth grade students as a part of the magnet program and additional personnel and programs have been added to help these students make the adjustment to high school.

The varsity boys’ basketball team won the state championship in 1991, 2003 & 2004. The boys' track and football teams have also won state championships. The school have won three championships in boys' track the last achievement in 1997 and their first in FHSAA Football was in 1998. The varsity football team is the first public high school in Duval County to earn a FHSAA State Championship in football. The varsity football team earned "back to back" state championships in 2017 & 2018. No other public school in Duval County have won consecutive football championships. Most recently, the girls' track team won "back to back" state championships in 2008 and 2009, the first state titles for a female sport at Raines.

Improvement
Raines was one of 11 schools nationwide selected by the College Board for inclusion in the EXCELerator School Improvement Model program beginning the 2006–2007 school year. The project was funded by the Bill & Melinda Gates Foundation. Principal George E. Maxey implemented several initiatives in the 2009–2010 school year to improve the school: after school tutoring, Saturday school, gender based courses & strict dress code policies. The result of those additions saw the schools grade improve. William M. Raines High School's grade improved to a "D" when the state released the school grades in October 2010. Alumnus Brian Dawkins donated $100,000 to refurbish the weight room and other areas of the schools field house, which afterward was named for him.

Alma mater
Words By Deloris Mangram & the French Classes of 1965
Music By Dr. Julian E. White

Dear William Raines,
The school we all adore:
We thine alone will be for evermore;
With love at heart, great heights ahead,
We stand within thy walls,
We cherish thee, we honor thee
And love thee best of all.
Dear William Raines,
Glorious and free;
We pledge our love,
We pledge our love to thee.
Dear William Raines,
We pledge our love to thee.

Notable alumni

Athletics 
 Derrick Alexander, played from 1995 to 1999, in the National Football League
 Gary Alexander, played from 1993 to 1994, in the National Basketball Association
 Ken Burrough, played from 1970 to 1981 in the National Football League
 Harold Carmichael, played from 1971  to 1984 in the National Football League
 Thornton Chandler, played from 1986 to 1989 in the National Football League
 Greg Coleman, played from 1977 to 1988 in the National Football League
 Vince Coleman, played from 1985 to 1997 in Major League Baseball
 Brian Dawkins, played from 1996 to 2011 in the National Football League
 Jackie Flowers, played from 1983 to 1985 in the United States Football League
 Derrick Gaffney, played for eight seasons in the National Football League
 Jabar Gaffney, plays in the National Football League
 Dominique Ross, played for two seasons in the National Football League
 Rod Gardner, played from 2001 to 2006 in the National Football League
 DeJuan Green, played in the National Football League
 Shawn Jefferson, played from 1991 to 2003 in the National Football League
Derwin Kitchen, basketball player for Ironi Nahariya of the Israeli Basketball Premier League
 Ron Lewis, played from 1990 to 1994 in the National Football League
 Calvin Muhammad, played from 1982 to 1987 in the National Football League
 Louis Nix, plays from 2014 to date in the National Football League
 Leonard Eugene Robinson, played from 1974 to 1985 in the National Basketball Association
 Patrick Sapp, played from 1996 to 1999 in the National Football League
 Lito Sheppard, played from 2002 to 2011 in the National Football League
 Kevin Youngblood, played in 2006 in the National Football League
 Kion Wilson, plays in the National Football League

Entertainment 
 Brenda Jackson, author
 Angela Robinson, actress

References

External links
 Official website

1965 establishments in Florida
Duval County Public Schools
Educational institutions established in 1965
High schools in Jacksonville, Florida
Historically black schools
Historically segregated African-American schools in Florida
Public high schools in Florida
Magnet schools in Florida
Northside, Jacksonville